Hans Eric Albert Dahlgren (born 16 March 1948) is a Swedish politician and former diplomat. A member of the Swedish Social Democratic Party, he served as Minister for European Union Affairs from January 2019 to October 17 2022 under Prime Minister Stefan Löfven; he retained the position in the Andersson Cabinet.

Career
Between 1997 and 2012, Dahlgren held various high-level positions in Sweden's diplomatic service, including as Swedish representative at the United Nations Security Council (1997–1998); as Permanent Representative to the United Nations in New York (1997–2000); as State Secretary for Foreign Affairs (2000–2006); as Permanent Representative to the UN in Geneva (2007–2010); and as Ambassador for Human Rights at the Ministry for Foreign Affairs (2010–2012).

From 2014 until 2019, Dahlgren served as State Secretary for International and EU Affairs in the Prime Minister's Office.

Other activities
World Economic Forum (WEF), Member of the Europe Policy Group (since 2017)

References

1948 births
Living people
Government ministers of Sweden
Politicians from Uppsala
Swedish Social Democratic Party politicians